The Besleney (Circassian: Bеслъэней, Bestləney,) (also known as Beslenei or Baslaney) are one of the twelve major Circassian tribes, representing one of the twelve stars on the green-and-gold Circassian flag. By character, culture and language, the Besleney are closest to Kabardians. The noble families of the Besleney were Kanoko and Shaloho, ancestors of Kabardian Prince Beslan, (the son of legendary Prince Inal),  who established his own tribe of the same name.

Population

The majority of the Besleney live in the valley of Bolshaya and Malaya Laba Rivers and on the bank of Urup in the Russian Republics of Karachay-Cherkessia, Krasnodar Krai and Adygea.  They also extend to the valleys of Chetem, Fars, Psefir, Kuban (Western Circassia).

Language

The Besleney people speak the Besleney sub-dialect of the Kabardian Adyghe dialect (East Circassian). However, because the Besleney tribe lived at the center of Circassia, the Besleney dialect also shares a large number of features with dialects of the West Adyghe dialect. The Besleney dialect also has an alveolar lateral ejective affricate , which corresponds to an alveolar lateral ejective fricative  in most other varieties of Circassian.

See also
 East Adyghe dialect
 West Adyghe dialect
 Other Circassian tribes:
 Abzakh
 Bzhedug
 Hatuqwai
 Kabardian
 Mamkhegh
 Natukhai
 Rescue of Leningrad Jewish children in Beslenei
 Shapsug
 Temirgoy
 Ubykh
 Yegeruqwai
 Zhaney

References

External links
 UCLA Phonetics Lab Archive - Recording Details for Kabardian Beslenei dialect

Circassians
Circassian tribes
Ethnic groups in Russia
Muslim communities of Russia
Kabardino-Balkaria
Karachay-Cherkessia
Adygea